Myra is the administrative centre of the municipality of Vegårshei in Agder, Norway. The village is located along the river Storelva, which flows out of the large Vegår lake, just to the north.

Myra sits at the junction of the Norwegian County Road 414 and Norwegian County Road 416. The Sørlandsbanen railway line stops just north of Myra at Vegårshei Station. As the administrative centre of Vegårshei, the government offices are located here along with a school and Vegårshei Church.

References

Villages in Agder
Vegårshei